Entre tu amor y mi amor (English: Separated by Love) is a Venezuelan telenovela written by Carlos Pérez for Venevisión. It premiered on June 15, 2016, with the final episode airing on November 28, 2016.

The series stars Rosmeri Marval as Sol, Daniel Elbittar as Alejandro, Simón Pestana as Heriberto and Carlota Sosa as Reina.

Plot
Sol is a young woman from the countryside who moves to the city in search of a better life. She meets Alejandro Monserrat and falls in love with him. But she later discovers that his mother Reina, is the woman who swindled her parents’ money and had them killed when she was just a baby. Now she will have to struggle to get justice and fight for her love with Alejandro.

Cast

Main 

Rosmeri Marval as Sol Buendía 
Daniel Elbittar as Alejandro Montserrat Caicedo
Simón Pestana as Heriberto Madroño
Carlota Sosa as Reina Caicedo de Montserrat

Secondary 

Juan Carlos García as José Domingo Morales
Eileen Abad as  Beatríz Alicia Monserrat Caicedo
Antonio Delli as Eloy Monserrat
María Antonieta Duque as Ricarda Blanco / Rika White
Marialejandra Martín as Columba Buendía de Morales
Yuvanna Montalvo as Aída Cárdenas Del Risco
 Greisy Mena as Maricielo Morales
Alexander Da Silva as Carlos "Carlucho" Machado Blanco
Flávia Gleske as Carmen García
Erick Ronsó as Sergio Tabares
Roberto Lamarca as Augusto Machado
Raquel Yánez as Yuliska Galindo 
Nacho Huett as Padre Ramón Echezuría
Ornella de la Rosa as Bárbara Monserrat 
Hecham Aljad as Cristo José Morales Estévez "Torombolo"
Vanessa Suárez as Giselle Eugenia Machado Blanco
Erika Santiago as Ana Isabel Domínguez
Grecia Augusta Rodríguez as Raquel Benítez
Héctor Peña as Rómulo Alarcón
Jhosuees Villarroel as Hugo Pernalete
Maira Alexandra Rodríguez as  Beatriz "Betty" Casares
Gabriel Correa Guzmán as Víctor Hugo Monserrat
Gibson Domínguez as Juan Luis
Leonardo Pantoja as Lito
Shaiara Pineau as Déborah Cristina

Guest 
 Nohely Arteaga as Raula Buendía
 Gustavo Camacho as Servando
 Marycarmen Sobrino as Doctora Meneses Ravelo
 Virginia Urdaneta as Directora del penal
Dayra Lambis as Magaly de Tabares
 Natalia Monasterios as Doctora Lucía Moreno
 Ángel Cueva as Dr. Benigno Dávila
 America Zerpa as Juana

Production 
Series production began on September 14, 2015 and ended on June 3, 2016. The series is written by Carlos Pérez with Carolina De Jacobo as executive producer. According to Carlos Pérez the title of the telenovela is inspired by the famous bolero "Perdón", composed by Pedro Flores.

Casting 
On September 16, 2015, actress Yuvanna Montalvo confirmed through her Instagram account, she would be part of the telenovela as an antagonist.

References

External links
 

Venevisión telenovelas
Venezuelan telenovelas
2016 telenovelas
2016 Venezuelan television series debuts
Spanish-language telenovelas
2016 Venezuelan television series endings
Television shows set in Caracas